Vitrain is a type of coal. Its combustion leads to ash containing extractable levels of germanium compounds such as germanium dioxide.

Coal